Demi Lovato is an American singer and actress who has won numerous awards during her career. Lovato rose to prominence for her role as "Mitchie Torres", in the musical television movie Camp Rock (2008), and her lead role in the Disney Channel original series Sonny with a Chance (2009–2011), while garnered her an ALMA Award and Teen Choice Awards. Lovato was also a judge and mentor of the second and third seasons of The X Factor (2012-2013), she set a Guinness World Record as the "Youngest X Factor Judge" in the history of the show, and for her judging work in The X Factor, she won People's Choice Award.

In 2009, Lovato released her second studio album Here We Go Again, the album topped the U.S. Billboard 200 chart. Unbroken (2011), Lovato's third studio album, spawned the single "Skyscraper", which earned her the MTV Video Music Award for Best Video with a Message. At the 2011 Teen Choice Awards, Lovato became first person to be honored the "Acuvue Inspire Award", with 14 wins she is the eight-most awarded solo artist in the awards' history. In 2013, Lovato released her self-titled fourth studio album Demi. The lead single "Heart Attack" received the Canadian iHeartRadio MuchMusic Video Award for Best International Artist Video. At the 40th People's Choice Awards, she won two awards, including Favorite Female Artist, in total Lovato has five wins at this award. Confident (2015) her fifth studio album was nominated for Best Pop Vocal Album at the 59th Annual Grammy Awards. In the same year, with the release of her album Confident Lovato received the Rulebreaker Award at the Billboard Women in Music event, and Latin American Music Awards as the "Favorite Crossover Artist". In 2016, she was honored with the GLAAD Vanguard Award at the GLAAD Media Awards. 

In 2017, she released her sixth studio album Tell Me You Love Me, featuring lead single "Sorry Not Sorry". The following year, Lovato was nominated for the American Music Awards and three Billboard Music Awards, including Top Female Artist, but won the Nickelodeon Kids' Choice Awards as Favorite Female Artist.   In two years from 2017-2018 Lovato released three collaborations that received major awards around the world, "Échame la Culpa" won "Song of the year" at the Latin American Music Awards. The collaboration Solo has been nominated for two BRIT Awards including British Single of the Year and British Video of the Year. In 2019, Lovato was nominated for Best Pop Duo/Group Performance at the 61st Annual Grammy Awards for the song "Fall in Line" with Christina Aguilera.

Awards and nominations

Other accolades

World records

Listicles

Notes

References

Awards
Lovato